Triplet Lakes is a group of lakes in Clearwater County, Minnesota, in the United States.

The group consists of three small lakes, hence the name.

See also
List of lakes in Minnesota

References

Lakes of Minnesota
Lakes of Clearwater County, Minnesota